Saddle Mountain is the tallest mountain in Clatsop County in the U.S. state of Oregon. Part of the Oregon Coast Range, Saddle Mountain is in Saddle Mountain State Natural Area in the northwest corner of Oregon. The peak is listed on Oregon's Register of Natural Heritage Resources.

Geology 

Saddle Mountain was created around 15 million years ago in the Miocene epoch when lava flows poured down the old Columbia River valley. When the lava encountered the water at the Astoria Sea, great steam explosions and thermal shocks occurred to create a large pile of basalt rocks. The mountain consists of this volcanic breccia, which is a rock made up of broken basalt fragments that are fused together in a fine-grained matrix.

History 
In modern time, the mountain has been viewed and described by a variety of European and American explorers. Beginning in 1788, these explorers included British captain John Meares, Lewis and Clark in 1805, and the Wilkes Expedition in 1841. Meares named the peak Mont de la Selle in 1788.

Access 
The hike to the taller of the two peaks is a  round trip consisting of challenging terrain. The lower peak—elevation — to the east and south does not have trail access. The trail is steep at times along rock outcroppings, but does offer views that include wildflowers in bloom in the springtime. Beside the trailhead is a picnic area and a primitive walk-in campground.

The access road to the mountain and state park is paved. The area contains dense forests of spruce and hemlock, and some ancient lava flows.

See also 
South Saddle Mountain

References

External links 
 
 

Mountains of the Oregon Coast Range
Landforms of Clatsop County, Oregon